Rankin is an unincorporated community in Roger Mills County, Oklahoma, United States.

Bessie S. McColgin (1875-1972), Oklahoma politician and businesswoman, lived in Rankin.

The settlement's early success was lost in 1928 after the Atchison, Topeka and Santa Fe Railway built its railline along Rush Creek two miles north, and town merchants moved to that location-- which became the new town of Reydon-- to be next to the tracks.

Notes

Unincorporated communities in Roger Mills County, Oklahoma
Unincorporated communities in Oklahoma